Infinity Girl was an American shoegazing band from Boston, Massachusetts, later based in Brooklyn, New York.

History
Infinity Girl began in 2012, self-releasing its first full-length album titled Stop Being On My Side in May as well as an EP titled Just Like Lovers in December.

In 2015, Infinity Girl released its second full-length album titled Harm, its first on Topshelf Records.

Infinity Girl released "Somewhere Nice, Someday" on September 8, 2017, through Disposable America. It was the band's third and final record.

Band members
Nolan Eley (guitars, vocals)
Kyle Oppenheimer (guitars, vocals)
Mitchell Stewart (bass)
Sebastian Modak (drums)

Studio albums
Stop Being On My Side (2012, self-released)
Harm (2015, Topshelf)
Somewhere Nice, Someday (2017, Disposable America)
EPs
Just Like Lovers (2012, self-released)

References

Musical groups from Boston
Musical groups established in 2011
American shoegaze musical groups
2011 establishments in Massachusetts
Topshelf Records artists